Edward Horst Leede (July 17, 1927 – February 24, 2018) was an American former professional basketball player. Leede was selected in the third round in the 1949 BAA Draft by the Providence Steamrollers. He played for the Boston Celtics, however, during his two-year BAA/NBA career. Dartmouth College, his alma mater, named their basketball arena after him. He would earn an MBA at Harvard Business School.  

He died on February 24, 2018, at the age of 90.

NBA career statistics

Regular season

Playoffs

References

External links
 Stats @ Basketball-reference.com

1927 births
2018 deaths
American men's basketball coaches
American men's basketball players
Basketball coaches from New York (state)
Basketball players from New York City
Bayside High School (Queens) alumni
Boston Celtics players
College men's basketball head coaches in the United States
Dartmouth Big Green men's basketball players
Forwards (basketball)
Guards (basketball)
MIT Engineers men's basketball coaches
Providence Steamrollers draft picks
Sportspeople from Queens, New York
Harvard Business School alumni